The UAB Blazers football team, representing the University of Alabama at Birmingham, has had 14 American football players drafted into the National Football League (NFL) since the university began its football program in 1991. This includes two players taken in the first round, of which the highest pick was Bryan Thomas at 22nd overall in 2002. No team has drafted more than one player from UAB. Only one former Blazer, Roddy White, has been selected for a Pro Bowl; White participated in four consecutive games. Following the end of the 2014 season, UAB's football program was officially cancelled due to low attendance and funding problems. After much debate, UAB president Ray L. Watts announced the program would return after a two-year hiatus, in 2017.

Each NFL franchise seeks to add new players through the annual NFL Draft. The draft rules were last updated in 2009. The team with the worst record the previous year picks first, the next-worst team second, and so on. Teams that did not make the playoffs are ordered by their regular-season record with any remaining ties broken by strength of schedule. Playoff participants are sequenced after non-playoff teams, based on their round of elimination (wild card, division, conference, and Super Bowl).

Seven of UAB's twelve draft picks were taken in the sixth round, and only four were selected in the first three. The highest number of UAB players taken in a single round is two. This occurred on three different years: 1998, with Dainon Sidney and Izell Reese, 2002, with Bryan Thomas and Eddie Freeman, and 2015, with J. J. Nelson and Kennard Backman. In addition, UAB has had two players selected in compensatory picks, which are additional selections awarded to teams who have lost key players. Izell Reese and Kennard Backman are the two players.

Key

Selections

Notes

References

General

Specific

UAB

UAB Blazers NFL Draft